Mesude Hülya Şanes Doğru (born 1963 in Istanbul) is a Turkish master craftsman, ceramic decorator and academic, trained in the art of miniature.

Early life 
Mesude Hülya Şanes Doğru was born in 1963 in Istanbul.

Education
In 1980 she started studying at the Istanbul State Academy of Fine Arts and graduated from the academy in 1985. She was educated in various Turkish Traditional Arts. In the field of tezhip she was taught by Tahsin Aykutalp, in the field of çini she was educated by Nezihe Bilgütay Derler, in the field of calligraphy she was educated by Hattat Mahmut Öncü, in the field of miniature she was educated by Neşe Aybey, in the field of bookbinding (cilt) she was educated by İslam Seçen and in the field of carpets and rugs by  Yusuf Durul and Aydın Uğurlu.

She completed her masters degree majoring in the field of tezhip under the guidance of Tahsin Aykutalp.

She completed her Doctoral Thesis in 1995 on the topic of hand crafts and art history. The thesis was a study concerning the origin of motif use in gilding, binding and architecture from the time of the Seljuks to the twentieth century.

Career
From 1984 to 1985 she tezhiped the calligraphy works of Hattat Savaş Çevik and in 1990 Hattat Mahmut Öncü. In 1987 she worked on the restoration of the Blue Mosque in the pencil works and calligraphy restorations. She became a master craftsman and professional ceramic decorator, and  Assistant Professor at the Sakarya University in 2001. As of 2017 she is still Assistant Professor at the Department of Traditional Turkish Handcrafts at the Sakarya University-Faculty of Fine Arts.

She has participated in both individual and collaborative exhibitions and also fairs and biennials. She has held 3 personal exhibitions as of 2017.

Exhibitions 
Umutlar, Nişart Gallery Maçka, (28 December 2015 - 5 January 2016) 2015-2016
Akademide Kadın, Sakarya University Online Exhibition, (8 March - 31 March) 2021

Publications 

 Book and Early Period Forms - Plate and Design Relation - 2015
 Konya Bölge Yazma Eserler Kütüphanesinde Bulunan Bir Yazma Eserin Tezhip Sanatı Açısından İncelenmesi - 2018
 Naturalist Flower Usage On Levni's Album - 14 August 2018
 The Ornamentation of the Hubanname and Zenanname Manuscript - December 2020

References 

1963 births
People from Istanbul
Turkish women academics
Academy of Fine Arts in Istanbul alumni
20th-century Turkish artists
21st-century Turkish artists
Living people